Ministry of Health and Social Welfare can mean:

 Ministry of Health and Social Welfare (Tanzania)
 Ministry of Health and Social Welfare (Liberia)